The 518th Sustainment Brigade is a sustainment brigade of the United States Army Reserve headquartered in Knightdale, North Carolina. The unit, having completed a tour of duty as the Sustainment Brigade for Resolute Support Mission, transferred authority to 1st Cavalry Division Sustainment Brigade on 17 September 2016.

Subordinate units
 518th Sustainment Brigade
 Headquarters and Headquarters Company (Knightdale, NC)
 Special Troops Battalion (Knightdale, NC)
352nd Combat Sustainment Support Battalion (Macon, GA)
231st Transportation Company (Athens, GA)
 346th Quartermaster Company (Los Alamitos, CA}
377th Quartermaster Company (Macon, GA)
 421st Quartermaster Company (Fort Valley, GA)
514th Transportation Detachment (Statham, GA)
802nd Ordnance Company (Gainesville, GA)
 275th Combat Sustainment Support Battalion (Fort Lee, VA)
460th Quartermaster Company (Suffolk, VA)
 470th Quartermaster Company (Fort Bragg, NC)
 824th Quartermaster Company (Fort Bragg, NC)
861st Quartermaster Company (Nashville, TN)
1006th Quartermaster Company (Knightdale, NC)

Decorations
 Meritorious Unit Commendation for service 29 January 2016 to 29 September 2016

References

518
Military units and formations of the United States Army Reserve
Military units and formations in North Carolina